Maria Karagiannopoulou (born 22 September 1972 in Ludwigshafen, Germany) is a Greek judoka.

She finished in joint fifth place in the extra-lightweight (48 kg) division at the 2004 Summer Olympics, having lost the bronze medal match to Julia Matijass of Germany.

References

Sports Reference

External links
Yahoo! Sports

1972 births
Living people
Greek female judoka
Olympic judoka of Greece
Judoka at the 1992 Summer Olympics
Judoka at the 2004 Summer Olympics
Sportspeople from Ludwigshafen
20th-century Greek women
21st-century Greek women